Verglas  may refer to:

 Verglas, a thin coating of glaze ice on rock
 Verglas Music, a record label that has released works such as Jabberwocky, a 1999 rock album
 Antoine Verglas (born 1962), a photographer
 Petit Verglas, a novel by Riad Sattouf, a French writer and cartoonist

it:Vetrato
pl:Gołoledź